Adarius Pickett (born September 5, 1996) is a gridiron football defensive back for the Toronto Argonauts of the Canadian Football League (CFL). He played college football at UCLA.

Early life 
His father Antoine Pickett, played minor league baseball for the Kansas City and Oakland systems. Graduated from El Cerrito High School in 2013 were played running back and cornerback, rushing for 1,800 yards and 31 touchdowns, while posting 70 tackles and nine interceptions, including three returned for touchdowns. At El Cerrito Pickett was named Bay Area News Group East Bay Football Player of the Year during highschool he played on both sides of the ball and on the special teams and got the nickname “Pick-Six” after making many big plays.

College career
Pickett played in 50 games over four seasons at UCLA, finishing his career with 274 tackles, one forced fumble, two fumble recoveries, seven interceptions and 20 passes defensed.
Pickett lead all defensive backs in the nation with 123 tackles as a senior, earning second-team All-Pac-12 for his efforts.

Professional career

Chicago Bears
Pickett signed with Chicago Bears as an undrafted free agent following the 2019 NFL Draft but was released on May 5.

Los Angeles Chargers
On May 16, 2019, Pickett signed with the Los Angeles Chargers. He was waived on August 31, 2019 and re-signed to the practice squad on September 17. He was released on October 1, 2019.

New England Patriots
On December 11, 2019, Pickett was signed to the New England Patriots practice squad. He signed a reserve/future contract on January 6, 2020. On July 26, 2020, Pickett was released before training camp opened.

Pickett had a tryout with the Tennessee Titans on August 23, 2020.

Montreal Alouettes
Pickett signed with the Montreal Alouettes of the CFL on June 9, 2021. In his first season, he played in 14 regular season games where he had 23 defensive tackles, 12 special teams tackles, one sack, one interception, and one forced fumble. In 2022, Pickett played in 16 regular season games and recorded 73 defensive tackles, seven special teams tackles, four sacks, one interception, three forced fumbles and two fumble recoveries. He became a free agent upon the expiry of his contract on February 14, 2023.

Toronto Argonauts
On the first day of free agency, on February 14, 2023, it was announced that Pickett had signed with the Toronto Argonauts.

References

External links
 Toronto Argonauts bio

1996 births
Living people
American football safeties
University of California, Los Angeles alumni
UCLA Bruins football players
Chicago Bears players
Los Angeles Chargers players
New England Patriots players
Montreal Alouettes players
Toronto Argonauts players